Ust-Kutsky District is an administrative district, one of the thirty-three in Irkutsk Oblast, Russia. Municipally, it is incorporated as Ust-Kutsky Municipal District. It is located in the center of the oblast. Its administrative center is the town of Ust-Kut. As of the 2010 Census, the total population of the district (excluding the administrative center) was 8,416.

Administrative and municipal status
Within the framework of administrative divisions, Ust-Kutsky District is one of the thirty-three in the oblast. The town of Ust-Kut serves as its administrative center. As a municipal division, the district is incorporated as Ust-Kutsky Municipal District.

Geography 
The district is located in the Lena-Angara Plateau area. The Kuta and Tayura, tributaries of the Lena River, flow across it.

References

Notes

Sources

Registry of the Administrative-Territorial Formations of Irkutsk Oblast 

Districts of Irkutsk Oblast
